Andy Wallace (born 19 February 1961, in Oxford, England) is a professional racing car driver from the United Kingdom, who has been racing since 1979. In 1976, Wallace attended the Jim Russell Racing Drivers' School. He is the current official Bugatti test driver. He has raced prototype sports cars since 1988, becoming the sixth driver to complete the informal triple Crown of endurance racing, and winning over 25 International Sports car races including:
 24 Hours of Le Mans
 24 Hours of Daytona (3 times)
 12 Hours of Sebring (2 times)
 Petit Le Mans .

According to the Autosport's Le Mans supplement, he liked the place so much that he became resident there. 

Wallace drove for Dyson Racing in the American Le Mans Series through the 2007 racing season.

In January 2008, Wallace drove for Alex Job Racing in the #23 Porsche-powered Daytona Prototype backed by Ruby Tuesday in the 24 Hours of Daytona, finishing in 36th place with engine problems.

On 2 August 2019, Wallace set a record of 300 mph in a Bugatti Chiron Super Sport 300+.

Racing record

24 Hours of Le Mans results

Complete Asia-Pacific Touring Car Championship results
(key) (Races in bold indicate pole position) (Races in italics indicate fastest lap)

Complete British Touring Car Championship results
(key) (Races in bold indicate pole position) (Races in italics indicate fastest lap)

Complete Deutsche Tourenwagen Meisterschaft results
(key) (Races in bold indicate pole position) (Races in italics indicate fastest lap)

External links

 British Racing Driver's Club page
 Official website

1961 births
Living people
English racing drivers
British Formula Three Championship drivers
British Touring Car Championship drivers
Rolex Sports Car Series drivers
BRDC Gold Star winners
American Le Mans Series drivers
International Formula 3000 drivers
24 Hours of Le Mans drivers
24 Hours of Le Mans winning drivers
24 Hours of Daytona drivers
European Le Mans Series drivers
World Sportscar Championship drivers
24 Hours of Spa drivers
12 Hours of Sebring drivers
Audi Sport drivers
TOM'S drivers
Jaguar Racing drivers
Highcroft Racing drivers
David Price Racing drivers
Level 5 Motorsports drivers